Gilles Mihălcean (born 18 April 1946) is a Canadian-born sculptor living and working in Montréal. Over the years, his works have been exhibited in Canada, the United States and Europe.

Biography
A self-taught sculptor, Mihalcean began his career in 1969. After teaching at Université Laval from 1972 to 1979, he has devoted himself entirely to sculpting. However, he was also worked as a lecturer at the Université de Montréal and the University of Ottawa. He rose to prominence in the 1980s, with major exhibits at the Musée d'art contemporain de Montréal and the Power Plant in Toronto, as well as commercial galleries such as Galerie René Blouin, Chantal Boulanger, Roger Bellemare and Circa.

Works
Révélation
Révolution
Trou de ver
Portrait (entre deux chaises)
La Maison
Le Livre
Vieille Branche
Brumes gaspésiennes
Nº 1, Lundi
La Ballade

Gallery

Awards
Prix des Concours artistiques du Québec (1969)
Victor Martyn Lynch-Staunton Award (1987)
Bourse de carrière Jean-Paul-Riopelle (2005)
Prix Paul-Émile-Borduas (2011)

References

Further reading

External links
 

1946 births
Living people
Artists from Montreal
Sculptors from Quebec
20th-century Canadian sculptors
Canadian male sculptors
Canadian people of Romanian descent
20th-century Canadian male artists
21st-century Canadian sculptors
21st-century Canadian male artists